The Lisbon Historic District is located at the intersection of U.S. Route 30 and Ohio route 45 in Lisbon, Ohio.
The town of Lisbon was located along important land and water transportation routes from the east into newly settled territories in the west. As a result of this, Lisbon, the second oldest town in Ohio, played an important part in the development of Ohio, which had been granted statehood in 1803.

The district features a number of commercial and residential buildings which were constructed during the period from 1810–1900. The buildings, examples of predominantly Federal architecture, were mostly constructed of brick. The historic district encompasses the original town square (pictured).

The Lisbon Historic District was added to the National Register of Historic Places in August 1979.

References

National Register of Historic Places in Columbiana County, Ohio
Federal architecture in Ohio
Historic districts in Columbiana County, Ohio
Squares in Ohio
Historic districts on the National Register of Historic Places in Ohio